Adiantum aethiopicum, also known as the common maidenhair fern, is a small fern of widespread distribution, occurring in Africa, Australia, Norfolk Island and New Zealand.

Adiantum aethiopicum was one of the many species first described by Linnaeus, in this case in his Systema naturae in 1759. The specific epithet aethiopicum in this sense was the Latin term for Africa south of the then known world, that is to say, more or less Africa south of Egypt.
In South Africa the species occurs widely, though not generally profusely, mainly on moist sandstone cliffs in full shade.

The rhizomes are wiry and branched. The fronds are horizontal and layered, or upright. They are divided into two or three and have many small wedge-shaped segments, each of which has sori along its margins underneath.

A common plant, often seen growing in moist areas. In Australia it is found near by creeks or in open forest, where it may form a large colony.

The 1889 book 'The Useful Native Plants of Australia’ records that "This plant is said to possess medicinal properties, being
slightly astringent and emetic. It has been used in Europe in making "Sirop de Capt'llaire," a demulcent drink, employed in
diseases of the chest."

Cultivation 
Adiantum aethiopicum is a popular and well known ornamental plant. Propagation is from plant division or by spores. In cultivation the Maidenhair fern prefers a well-lit situation inside, but a shady place outdoors without draughts. It is suitable for terrariums and hanging baskets. It is fairly easy to grow, and will flourish in moist garden soil or potting mix.

References 

aethiopicum
Ferns of Africa
Ferns of Australasia
Ferns of Australia
Ferns of New Zealand
Flora of Southern Africa
Flora of South Africa
Flora of New South Wales
Flora of Queensland
Flora of South Australia
Flora of Tasmania
Flora of Victoria (Australia)
Flora of Western Australia
Flora of Norfolk Island
Plants described in 1759
Taxa named by Carl Linnaeus
Garden plants of Africa
Garden plants of Australasia
House plants